Music From the HBO Film: Angels in America  is the original soundtrack album, on the Nonesuch label, of the 2003 Emmy Award-winning and Golden Globe-winning miniseries Angels in America. It was nominated for Grammy Award for Best Score Soundtrack Album for a Motion Picture, Television or Other Visual Media.

The original score and songs were all composed by Thomas Newman, unless said otherwise.

Track listing

References

Film soundtracks
2003 soundtrack albums
Television soundtracks